Léopold Jorédié (1947 – 8 September 2013) was a former Vice President of the Government of New Caledonia who served under Jean Lèques. As VP he was given a suspended sentence for corruption. In 2007 he was declared unfit to hold public office and declared bankrupt. He was a member of the Federation of Pro-Independence Co-operation Committees. Although the FCCI itself is a moderate nationalist party, from the 1980s onward he was seen as more militant and even open to "armed struggle" against the French.

References

1947 births
2013 deaths
Vice presidents of the Government of New Caledonia
Kanak people